An American Widow is a 1917 silent comedy film directed by Frank Reicher and starring Ethel Barrymore. It is based on a 1909 play by Kellett Chambers. Metro Pictures produced and distributed.

Cast
Ethel Barrymore as Elizabeth Carter
Irving Cummings as Jasper Mallory
Dudley Hawley as Earlof Dettminster
Ernest Stallard as Augustus Tucker
Charles Dickson as Theodore Bacon
Alfred Kappler as Pitney Carter
Arthur Lewis as Carstairs
Pearl Browne as Mme. Albani

Preservation
With no copies of An American Widow located in any film archives, it is considered a lost film.

See also
Ethel Barrymore on stage, screen and radio

References

External links

1917 films
American silent feature films
Lost American films
Films directed by Frank Reicher
Metro Pictures films
American black-and-white films
Silent American comedy films
1917 comedy films
1917 lost films
Lost comedy films
1910s American films